Belynda Henry as a multiple Wynne and Archibald prize finalist is one of Australia’s leading landscape painters. She is also a member of Australian Watercolour Society.

Reception 
Henry is known for her 'evocative paintings' and her works have been exhibited over 30 solo shows. The Age recently included her in the feature story, ‘Seven Artists You Should Invest in Now’. In 2019 Henry has been featured in Thames & Hudson’s tome, ‘A Painted Landscape’ – featuring the works of landscape artists including, Elizabeth Cummings, John Olsen, Ann Thompson, Rick Amor among other notable landscape painters. Most recently in a sell-out show in New York, a majority of her works were acquired by style arbiter and collector Christian Louboutin.

Notable works 
In 2020 Henry's solo exhibition at the Australian Galleries featured the sounds of recorded bird calls from around the artist's studio as well as a suspended sculptural installation by floral artist Tracey Deep. The exhibition To Paint Is To Love was reported to be a 'sensory and immersive experience' for the audiences as Vogue mentioned, "Henry is creating an immersive show that will capture the sounds and sights of her rural Central Coast studio to give visitors a sense of where her pieces are formed and how she works".

Selected solo exhibitions 

 2020 ‘to paint is to love’, Australian Galleries, Sydney
 2020 ‘The Space Between’, Olsen Gruin, New York
 2019 ‘Waterfalls and Waterholes’, Australian Galleries, Sydney
 2019 ‘Reflections’, Flinders Lane Gallery, Melbourne
 2018 ‘Landscape Lines’, Australian Galleries, Sydney
 2017 ‘Wanderer’, Flinders Lane Gallery, Melbourne
 2016 ‘Distance’, Flinders Lane Gallery, Melbourne
 2016 ‘Living colour’, Olsen Irwin Works on Paper, Small Paintings and Sculpture, Sydney
 2016 ‘Mountain Sky’, The Design Files, Sydney
 2016 Flinders Lane Gallery, Melbourne
 2015 ‘Higher’, Koskela, Sydney
 2014 ‘Open House’, The Design Files, Melbourne
 2014 ‘Overgrown’, The Design Files, Melbourne
 2014 ‘Jigsaw’, Anthea Polson Art, Main Beach, QLD
 2012 ‘Colour My World – New Sculptures and Paintings’, Richard Martin Art, Sydney
 2010 ‘Overview’, Richard Martin Art, Sydney
 2007 ‘Shimmer’, Greenhill Galleries, Perth
 2007 ‘Shadows of Nature’, Richard Martin Art, Sydney
 2006 ‘Recent Paintings’, Libby Edwards Galleries, Brisbane
 2005 ‘Life and Paddocks’, Richard Martin Art, Sydney
 2005 ‘New Paintings’, Gallery 460, Green Point, NSW
 2005 ‘Driving’, Libby Edwards Galleries, Sydney
 2004 ‘Still Life Paintings’, Libby Edwards Galleries, Melbourne
 2004 ‘New Paintings’, Greenhill Galleries, Adelaide
 2004‘New Paintings’, Greenhill Galleries, Perth
 2003 Libby Edwards Galleries, Sydney
 2002 Libby Edwards Galleries, Melbourne
 2002 ‘Paddock Lines’, Greenhill Galleries, Adelaide
 2001 ‘Floating Over Paddocks’, Von Bertouch Galleries, Newcastle, NSW
 2001 ‘Light and Paddocks’, Avoca Fine Arts Gallery, Avoca, NSW
 1999 ‘Love, Light and Paddocks’, Avoca Fine Arts Gallery, Avoca, NSW
 1996 ‘And Anywhere Is’, Avoca Fine Arts Gallery, Avoca, NSW
 1994 ‘Playing in the Secret Garden’, Avoca Fine Arts Gallery, Avoca, NSW

Sources 

 Art Almanac, April 2014, p. 54
 Feagins Lucy; "Jigsaw", The Design Files, March 2014
 Giles Auty; "After the Bald was over", The Weekend Australian, March 2000
 McClelland, Anna: “Celebrated artist Belynda Henry exhibits at Koskela”, Buro 24/7, March 2015
 Parker Loni; "Autumn Colours", Adore Home Magazine, March 2014
 Style curator, October 2014
 Vogue Living, July – August 2018, p.36
 Vogue, July 2018, p.76 – 77
 "Works on paper", Inside Out Magazine, August 2014, p.40

References 

Living people
21st-century Australian women artists
Australian contemporary artists
Year of birth missing (living people)
Archibald Prize finalists